George John  Alexander (born 22 June 2001) is an English footballer who plays for Welling United, on loan from Bromley.

Career 
Born in London, Alexander signed for Millwall at the age of seven. He spent twelve years in the Academy before making his first team debut in the last game of the season on 5 May 2019, coming on a late substitute in the 1–0 defeat to Wigan Athletic. He had previously been on the bench earlier in the season for an FA Cup tie with Everton.

Personal life 
Born into a family of Millwall fans, his father, Gary, was a professional footballer and played for the club for three years between 2007–2010.

Career statistics

References 

2001 births
Living people
Footballers from Bexley
English footballers
Association football forwards
Millwall F.C. players
Bromley F.C. players
English Football League players